The 1969 NCAA University Division Outdoor Track and Field Championships were contested June 19−21 at the 47th annual NCAA-sanctioned track meet to determine the individual and team national champions of men's collegiate University Division outdoor track and field events in the United States. 

This year's outdoor meet was hosted by the University of Tennessee at Tom Black Track at LaPorte Stadium in Knoxville. 

San José State finished atop the team standings, claiming their first team national title.

Team result 
 Note: Top 10 only
 (H) = Hosts

References

NCAA Men's Outdoor Track and Field Championship
NCAA University Division Track and Field Championships
NCAA University Division Track and Field Championships
NCAA